is a men's volleyball team based in Hirakata city, Osaka, Japan. It plays in V.League Division 1. The club was founded in 1951.

The owner of the club is Panasonic Corporation.

Team

Current roster

Notable players

 Takahiro Yamamoto (2001-2013)
 Tatsuya Fukuzawa (2008-2014 and 2016-2019)
 Kunihiro Shimizu (2008-Present)

 Nalbert Bitencourt (2002-2004)
 Luiz Felipe Fonteles (2007-2008)
 Dante Amaral(2013-2014 and 2015-2016)
 Thiago Alves (2011-2012 and 2014-2015)

 Michał Kubiak (2016-Present)

Honours
Japan Volleyball League/V.League/V.Premier League
 Champions (×6): 1971–72, 2007–08, 2009–10, 2011–12, 2013–14, 2018-19
 Runners-up  (×6): 1967–68, 1968–69, 1969–70, 1970–71, 1972–73, 2012–13, 2019–20, 2020–21
Kurowashiki All Japan Volleyball Tournament
 Champions (×9): 1964, 1966, 1968, 1969, 1973, 1981, 1998, 2009, 2014
Emperor's Cup
 Champions (×2): 2011, 2012
 Runner-up (×1): 2008
Asian Men's Club Volleyball Championship
 Runner-up (×1): 2019
 Third place (×1) : 2010

League results
 Champion   Runner-up

References

External links 
 Official Website

Japanese volleyball teams
Volleyball clubs established in 1952
Sports teams in Osaka Prefecture
Panasonic
1952 establishments in Japan